John Aloysius O'Connor (11 October 1906 – c. 1980) was a rugby union player who represented Australia.

O'Connor, a lock, was born in Dundas, New South Wales and claimed a total of 4 international rugby caps for Australia.

References

Australian rugby union players
Australia international rugby union players
1906 births
1980 deaths
Rugby union players from Sydney
Rugby union locks